Ranheim is a surname. Notable people with the surname include:

Egil Solin Ranheim (1923–1992), Norwegian politician
Paul Ranheim (born 1966), American ice hockey player